Clinical Pastoral Education (CPE) is education to teach spiritual care to clergy and others. CPE is the primary method of training hospital and hospice chaplains and spiritual care providers in the United States, Canada, Australia and New Zealand. CPE is both a multicultural and interfaith experience that uses real-life ministry encounters of students to improve the care provided by caregivers.

Theory
An underpinning theory of education that structures clinical pastoral education is the "Action-Reflection" mode of learning. CPE students typically compose "verbatims" of their pastoral care encounters in which they are invited to reflect upon what occurred and draw insight from these reflections that can be implemented in future pastoral care events.

History
Although the practice of spiritual care has a long tradition in Christianity and to some extent in other faith traditions, the systematic analysis of practice associated with clinical pastoral education had its beginnings in the early 20th century. In 1925, Richard Cabot, a physician and adjunct lecturer at the Harvard Divinity School, published an article in Survey Graphic suggesting that every candidate for ministry receive clinical training for pastoral work similar to the clinical training offered to medical students. In the 1930s, the Reverend Anton Boisen placed theological students at the Chicago Theological Seminary in supervised contact with patients in mental hospitals, a flagship program that later resulted in the forming of the ACPE. In 1952, combining the work of Professor Paul E. Johnson and the philanthropy of Albert V. Danielsen,  Boston University established within its School of Theology the Danielsen Pastoral Counseling Center, which was accredited by the American Association of Pastoral Counselors.  Now the Danielsen Institute, it trains in its mental-health clinic doctoral candidates and fellows in pastoral counseling.

Accrediting bodies

CPE in Australia and New Zealand is conducted by six CPE accrediting associations that consult together for common curricula and standards of practice under an umbrella association, the Australia New Zealand Association of Clinical Pastoral Education (ANZACPE). The six constituent associations are: New South Wales College of Clinical Pastoral Education (New South Wales and the Australian Capital Territory); Queensland Institute of Clinical Pastoral Education; Association for Supervised Pastoral Education in Australia (Victoria and Tasmania); Association for Clinical Pastoral Education in Western Australia; South Australia and Northern Territory Association for Clinical Pastoral Education; and New Zealand Association for Clinical Pastoral Education.

In the United States there are currently two organizations who are recognized by the United States Department of Education. The Association for Clinical Pastoral Education is recognized as an accrediting agency for CPE programs by the U.S. Department of Education.  The Institute for Clinical Pastoral Training is accredited by the Accrediting Council for Continuing Education & Training (ACCET). ACCET is listed by the U.S. Department of Education as a nationally recognized accrediting agency. Likewise, there are over two hundred and seventy accredited seminary graduate programs with the Association of Theological Schools in the United States and Canada (ATS)  in which some provide specializations in clinical pastoral education. 

In Canada, all CPE training and accreditation is done through CASC/ACSS, the Canadian Association of Spiritual Care / Association Canadienne de Soins Spirituels.

References

 
Chaplains
Religious education